The 1984 season of the African Cup Winners' Cup football club tournament was won by Al Ahly in two-legged final victory against Canon Yaoundé. This was the tenth season that the tournament took place for the winners of each African country's domestic cup. Thirty-five sides entered the competition, with CAP Owendo and Horoya AC withdrawing before the 1st leg of the first round.

Preliminary round

|}

1:2nd leg abandoned at 1-0 for Lage after 80 minutes due to darkness; Avia Sports qualified

First round

|}

1:CAP Owendo were disbanded by the Gabon government before 1st leg.
2:Horoya AC withdrew before 1st leg due to death of Guinea's president Ahmed Sekou Touré.

Second round

|}

Quarterfinals

|}

Semifinals

|}

Final
Al-Ahli SC (Tripoli) withdrew before the final for political reasons (refusing to play Egyptian teams) and were replaced by Canon Yaoundé.

|}

Winners

External links
 Results available on CAF Official Website

African Cup Winners' Cup
2